The Shot of the Week Award at the annual Scotties Tournament of Hearts is presented to the individual curler who executes the most outstanding shot during the tournament.  The award has been presented since 1997.  The inaugural winner was Sandra Schmirler of Saskatchewan.  It was last presented in 2013.

Winners

References

Shot of the Week Award